Ayushmann Khurrana (born Nishant Khurrana; 14 September 1984) is an Indian actor and singer who works in Hindi films. Known for his portrayals of ordinary men often battling social norms, he is the recipient of several awards, including a National Film Award and four Filmfare Awards. He has appeared in Forbes India Celebrity 100 list of 2013 and 2019, and Time named him one of the 100 most influential people in the world in 2020.

Khurrana won the second season of reality television show MTV Roadies in 2004 and ventured into an anchoring career. He made his film debut in 2012 with the romantic comedy Vicky Donor, in which his performance as a sperm donor earned him the Filmfare Award for Best Male Debut. Following a brief setback, he starred in the commercially and critically successful Dum Laga Ke Haisha (2015).

Khurrana established himself with several box-office hits, including the comedy-dramas Bareilly Ki Barfi (2017), Shubh Mangal Saavdhan (2017), Badhaai Ho (2018), Dream Girl (2019), and Bala (2019); the thriller Andhadhun (2018); and the crime drama Article 15 (2019). His performances as a blind pianist in Andhadhun and an honest cop in Article 15 won him two consecutive Filmfare Critics Award for Best Actor, and he also won the National Film Award for Best Actor for the former. This success was followed by several films that gained positive reviews but fared poorly at the box office.

In addition to his acting roles, Khurrana has sung for several of his films. His song "Pani Da Rang", which he sang and co-composed, earned him the Filmfare Award for Best Male Playback Singer.

Early life and education 
Khurrana was born in a Punjabi Hindu family, on 14 September 1984 in Chandigarh to Poonam and P. Khurrana, as Nishant Khurrana. His parents changed his name to Ayushmann Khurrana when he was 3 years old. He was a part of Guru Nanak Khalsa College. He studied at St. John's High School, Chandigarh and DAV College, Chandigarh. He majored in English literature and has a master's degree in Mass Communication from the School of Communication Studies, Panjab University. He did serious theatre for five years. During his college days he has done several plays in Gaiety Theatre, Shimla. He was also the founding member of DAV College's "Aaghaaz" and "Manchtantra", which are active theatre groups in Chandigarh. He conceived and acted in street plays and won prizes in national college festivals such as Mood Indigo (IIT Bombay), OASIS (Birla Institute of Technology and Science, Pilani) and St. Bedes Shimla. He also won a Best Actor award for playing Ashwatthama in Dharamvir Bharati's Andha Yug.

Career

2004–2011: Television shows and early career 
After completing his graduation and post-graduation in Journalism, his first job was as a radio personality at BIG FM, Delhi. He hosted the show Big Chai – Maan Na Maan, Main Tera Ayushmann and also won the Young Achievers Award in 2007 for it. He was the youngest recipient of the Bharat Nirman Award in New Delhi.

He also worked in many other MTV shows such as MTV Fully Faltoo Movies, Cheque De India and Jaadoo Ek Baar. He then turned television host with a multiple-talent-based reality show India's Got Talent on Colors TV, which he co-anchored with Nikhil Chinapa, and Stripped, which gave latest updates on the Indian TV industry with a comic tinge, again on MTV. At the end of the year, he was also the anchor of the singing reality show Music Ka Maha Muqqabla on STAR Plus.

Apart from hosting the second season of MTV Rock On and India's Got Talent on Colors, he was also a part of the anchoring team of Extra Innings T20 for Indian Premier League Season 3 on SET Max with Gaurav Kapur, Samir Kochhar, and Angad Bedi, following which he took up the offer of anchoring the dance-based reality show Just Dance on STAR Plus.

2012–2015: Film debut and career struggles 

Khurrana made his acting debut in 2012 with Shoojit Sircar's romantic comedy Vicky Donor, co-starring Annu Kapoor and debutante Yami Gautam. Marking the production debut of actor John Abraham, who cameoed in a promotional song, it starred Khurrana in the titular role of a sperm donor. In preparation, he attended acting workshops and interacted with medical professionals. For the film's soundtrack, he sang "Pani Da Rang", which he had written and composed with Rochak Kohli back in 2003. Praising the film's ensemble cast, Sukanya Verma of Rediff.com wrote that Khurrana's "candid disposition and roguish face ensures his street smart drollery works like a breeze". At the Filmfare Awards ceremony, Khurrana was awarded trophies for Best Male Debut and Best Male Playback Singer.

He then collaborated with Kunaal Roy Kapur in Rohan Sippy's Nautanki Saala! (2013), a comedy based on the French film Après Vous (2005). Anupama Chopra found Khurrana to be "earnest" in it but felt that his comedic work was overshadowed by that of Roy Kapur. He also recorded two songs for the film's soundtrack. A year later, Khurrana teamed with Yash Raj Films, as part of a three-film deal, in the romantic comedy Bewakoofiyaan (2014), co-starring Sonam Kapoor and Rishi Kapoor, about a young man who has trouble convincing his girlfriend's father to approve of their marriage. Writing for The New York Times, Andy Webster disliked the film's "strained, contrived humor" but commended Khurrana for "holding his own opposite [Rishi] Kapoor". Both Nautanki Saala and Bewakoofiyaan were commercially unsuccessful, as was his next release, Hawaizaada (2015). In it, he played the scientist Shivkar Bapuji Talpade, for which he lost weight and learnt to speak Marathi. In the same year, Khurrana collaborated with his wife, Tahira Kashyap, to write his autobiography Cracking the Code: My Journey to Bollywood.

Khurrana's career prospects improved when he starred opposite newcomer Bhumi Pednekar in Sharat Katariya's romance Dum Laga Ke Haisha (2015). It tells the story of an underachieving man who is married against his will to an overweight woman, and marked his first film where he did not sing any of the songs. Anuj Kumar of The Hindu praised him for effectively capturing his character's "diction and body language". Despite minimal promotions, the film emerged as a commercial success, grossing over  worldwide against its  budget.

2017–2020: Critical and commercial success 
Two years later, after starring in the poorly received Meri Pyaari Bindu opposite Parineeti Chopra, Khurrana's career progressed with his two other films releases of 2017, the romantic-comedy dramas Bareilly Ki Barfi and Shubh Mangal Saavdhan, both of which were commercially successful. Adapted from Nicolas Barreau's French novel The Ingredients of Love, the former starred him alongside Rajkummar Rao and Kriti Sanon as a writer who gets involved in a love triangle with a tomboyish girl and a timid salesman. Saibal Chatterjee of NDTV wrote that Khurrana does a "convincing job of mutating from a brooding jilted lover to a crooked manipulator who puts his own interests above everyone else's". In the latter, he starred opposite Pednekar as a newly engaged man suffering from erectile dysfunction. A remake of the Tamil film Kalyana Samayal Saadham (2013), the film, Khurrana hoped, had a humorous take on mental and sexual problems faced by men which would bring wider attention to the topic. Rajeev Masand took note of how well the film handled sexuality without being crude and commended him for "investing the fellow with genuine likeability and an understated charm". Khurrana received a nomination for the Filmfare Award for Best Actor for the latter film.

2018 featured Khurrana in two of the highest-grossing Hindi films of the year, both of which won National Film Awards. His first role was in Sriram Raghavan's Andhadhun, a thriller co-starring Tabu and Radhika Apte, in which he played a blind pianist who unwillingly becomes embroiled in a murder. He lobbied for the part after hearing about it from casting director Mukesh Chhabra, and in preparation, learnt how to play the piano and interacted with blind piano players. Udita Jhunjhunwala of Mint praised Khurrana for giving a "taut performance that balances vulnerability with craftiness" and Ankur Pathak of HuffPost found his to be "a layered, no-holds-barred performance worth applauding". Andhadhun earned  worldwide, a majority of which came from the Chinese box office, to become Khurrana's highest-grossing release and one of Indian cinema's biggest grossers. He next starred in Badhaai Ho, a comedy from director Amit Ravindernath Sharma about a young man whose middle-aged mother gets pregnant. Anna M. M. Vetticad of Firstpost considered his performance to be "completely convincing" and commended him for choosing "to work in small films where the star is the story". A surprise blockbuster, it earned over  worldwide. For Andhadhun, Khurrana won the National Film Award for Best Actor and Filmfare Critics Award for Best Actor.

The series of huge successful and blockbuster films continued with Khurrana's 2019 releases: Article 15, Dream Girl, and Bala. The formermost was a crime thriller directed by Anubhav Sinha in which he played a righteous police officer solving a rape case. Highlighting caste discrimination in India, the film was inspired by multiple events including the 2014 Badaun gang rape allegations and the 2016 Una flogging incident. It was his first dark and intense character in his film career. Writing for The Guardian, Wendy Ide commended him for "combin[ing] soulful Bollywood heartthrob charisma with an arrestingly intense performance." Dream Girl starred him as a cross-gender actor who speaks in a female voice while working at a call centre which unwittingly attracts male attention. Nandini Ramnath of Scroll.in considered his "manic energy and believable Everyman persona" to be the film's highlight. The lattermost was a satire on societal standards of beauty from Stree director Amar Kaushik, in which he played a young man who faces societal pressure due to premature balding. He found it physically challenging to play the part due to the heavy layers of prosthetics used on his head. It marked his second film where he did not sing any of the songs. Rajeev Masand opined that Khurrana "cuts a sympathetic figure as another not-instantly-likeable loser" and added that he had "cornered the market when it comes to playing flawed, insecure men with confidence issues". He won another Filmfare Critics Award for Best Actor for Article 15 and received a Best Actor nomination at the ceremony for Bala.

For his next project, Khurrana actively looked for another mainstream film that would portray sexuality in a humorous manner. He found it in Shubh Mangal Zyada Saavdhan (2020), in which he played a gay man who has trouble convincing his partner's family of their relationship. Shubhra Gupta of The Indian Express credited Khurrana for "allowing the film to be so much about" his lesser known co-star Jitendra Kumar. The film's box office was impacted by the shutdown of cinemas due to 2020 coronavirus pandemic. He was next seen in the comedy-drama Gulabo Sitabo, directed by Sircar and co-starring Amitabh Bachchan. Due to the pandemic, the film premiered directly on Amazon Prime Video. Pallabi Dey Puryakastha of The Times of India noted that Khurrana's "body language tellingly portrays sadness and bitterness borne out of poverty".

2021–present
In 2021, Khurrana played a bodybuilder who falls in love with a trans woman in Abhishek Kapoor's romantic comedy Chandigarh Kare Aashiqui. He then reunited with Sinha for the Northeast India-based Anek (2022). Khurrana next headlined Anubhuti Kashyap's medical drama, Doctor G (2022), with Rakul Preet Singh and Shefali Shah, and starred in Aanand L. Rai's production, An Action Hero, directed by Anirudh Iyer. Despite positive reviews, none of these films performed well at the box office.

Filmography

Accolades

Personal life 
Khurrana was born in Chandigarh. His father P. Khurrana is an astrologer and an author on the subject of astrology, whereas his mother Poonam is a housewife and she is of half-Burmese descent, and a qualified M.A. in Hindi.

While Khurrana remains busy with his work in Mumbai, his family still stays in Chandigarh. His brother Aparshakti Khurana is a radio jockey at Radio Mirchi 98.3 FM in Delhi and made his debut in the 2016 Aamir Khan-starrer film Dangal. The ambience of literature at home influenced Khurrana as well and he took writing as a hobby. He also maintains a blog where he writes in Hindi and it has been received very well by his admirers.

Khurrana is known for being very close to his family and wife, Tahira Kashyap, who has directed a critically acclaimed film Toffee. They are childhood friends and parents to a son and a daughter. Both Ayushmann and Tahira are followers of Nichiren Buddhism, helping them get through Tahira's cancer diagnosis.

Discography

References

Bibliography

External links 
 
 
 

Living people
1984 births
Indian VJs (media personalities)
Indian male television actors
Participants in Indian reality television series
Reality show winners
Punjabi people
Indian people of Burmese descent
Indian Buddhists
Converts to Buddhism from Hinduism
Male actors from Chandigarh
Indian male playback singers
Musicians from Chandigarh
Filmfare Awards winners
Indian game show hosts
Best Actor National Film Award winners
International Indian Film Academy Awards winners
Screen Awards winners
Zee Cine Awards winners